Vincent Da Sylva (born 8 January 1973) is a Senegalese-French retired basketball player. He represented Senegal at the 1998 FIBA World Championship. In his career, he played in Senegal, Lebanon and France.

Honours
  Bronze medal with the Championship of Africa in 1994 (Alexandria, Egypt)
  Gold medal Championship of Africa in 1997 (Dakar, Sénégal)

Individual awards
 Best Scorer of the Championship of Senegal: 1996-97 
 All Star FLB (Lebanon): 1998

References

External links
Senegal at the 1998 World Championship
Eurobasket profile

Senegalese men's basketball players
1973 births
Living people
Shooting guards
Small forwards
1998 FIBA World Championship players
AS Douanes basketball players